Nélida Romero (January 17, 1926 – January 14, 2015) was an Argentine actress. She starred in the 1950 film Arroz con leche under director Carlos Schlieper, who was her husband from 1944 to 1957.

Filmography
Who is killing the sparrows? (2000)
Spoiled brat (short - 1993)
The virgin Gaucho (1987)
A cage has no secrets (1962)
Christmas in June (1960)
The bells of Teresa (1957)
Alejandra (1956)
My husband and my boyfriend (1955)
Requiebro (1955)
Eyes full of love (1954)
Clown (1952)
 The Honourable Tenant (1951) ... Elena
Things Women (1951)
The heroic Bonifacio (1951)
What little sister (1951)
Rice Pudding (1950)
Breach of trust (1950)
Latest Model Wife (1950)
When my husband kisses (1950)
Meet at the stars (1949)
Madame Bovary (1947) ... Artemis
The Portrait (1947)
 The Three Rats (1946) ... Dressmaker

Television
The poor Clara (1984) (series) ... Emilia
24 Hours (1981) (series)
A Light in the City (1971) (series) ... Susan
A life to love you (1970) (series) Fina ...
When given you by the Comte? (1966) (movie)

References

External links
 
 

Argentine film actresses
1926 births
2015 deaths